"When the Bassline Drops" is a song by British singer Craig David and British rapper Big Narstie. It was David's first single in six years, it was released on 27 November 2015 by Insanity and Speakerbox Media as the lead single from his sixth studio album, Following My Intuition (2016). The song was written by David, Scott Wild and Tyrone Lindo, and peaked at number ten on the UK Singles Chart.

Background
The song sees David return to his UK garage roots, and is his first single release since "All Alone Tonight (Stop, Look, Listen)" in May 2010. The "Ravers Edition" music video was released on 10 December. The song premiered on MistaJam's show on BBC Radio 1Xtra on 7 November 2015.

Chart performance
The song entered at number fifty on the UK Singles Chart on 4 December 2015 – for the week ending dated 10 December 2015 – before climbing to number ten nine weeks later. This gave David his first top ten hit since "Hot Stuff (Let's Dance)" in 2007.

Music video
A music video to accompany the release of "When the Bassline Drops" was first released onto YouTube on 10 December 2015 at a total length of three minutes and five seconds.

Live performances
David and Big Narstie performed "When the Bassline Drops" on The Jonathan Ross Show on 30 January 2016.

Track listing

Charts

Weekly charts

Year-end charts

Certifications

Release history

References

2015 singles
2015 songs
Songs written by Craig David
Craig David songs
UK garage songs